Kathleen "Lally" Bowers (21 January 1914 – 18 July 1984) was an English actress.

Bowers was born in Oldham, Lancashire, where she was educated at Hulme Grammar School.  She worked as a secretary before walking-on and understudying at the Shakespeare Memorial Theatre in Stratford-upon-Avon. As a professional actress Bowers appeared in hundreds of stage productions, films and television programmes and rep at Manchester, Sheffield, Southport, Guildford, Liverpool, Birmingham and the Bristol Old Vic.

Her London debut came in 1944 and her many West End successes included Dinner With the Family for which she won a Clarence Derwent award in 1957, Difference of Opinion, The Killing of Sister George (also on Broadway), Dear Octopus and The Beastly Beatitudes of Balthazar B. She appeared in the sitcoms You're Only Young Twice, Going Straight, Hi-De-Hi, My Name Is Harry Worth and A Fine Romance, and her film career included roles in We Joined the Navy (1962), Tamahine (1963), The Chalk Garden (1964), I Start Counting (1970), All the Way Up (1970), Up Pompeii (1971), Our Miss Fred (1972), Dracula A.D. 1972 (1972), The Slipper and the Rose (1976) and Screamtime (1983). She also appeared in the 1982 adaptation of Agatha Christie's The Case of The Discontented Soldier in the role of Mrs. Ariadne Oliver, in the television series The Agatha Christie Hour.
Was the vicar sister in episode 4 of Rumpole of the Bailey on the radio.

Death
Bowers died on 18 July 1984 in London, aged 70.

Partial filmography
We Joined the Navy (1962) – Mrs. Cynthia Dewberry
Tamahine (1963) – Mrs. Cartwright
The Chalk Garden (1964) – Anna
Undermined – Broadcast -12/6/1965- Effie, ( Paddington Hotel Proprietress ). Episode 6 : ' Intent to Kill '.I Start Counting (1970) – Aunt ReneAll the Way Up (1970) – Mrs. HadfieldUp Pompeii (1971) – ProcuriaUp the Chastity Belt (1972) – (voice)Dracula A.D. 1972 (1972) – MatronOur Miss Fred (1972) – Miss FloddenThe Slipper and the Rose (1976) – QueenScreamtime'' (1983) – Mrs. Kingsley

References

External links
Performances in the Theatre Archive, University of Bristol

1914 births
1984 deaths
English stage actresses
English television actresses
Actresses from Oldham
People educated at Oldham Hulme Grammar School
20th-century British actresses
20th-century English women
20th-century English people